Mactra is a large genus of medium-sized marine bivalve mollusks or clams, commonly known as trough shells or duck clams. Mactra is the type genus within the family Mactridae.

The word "trough" in the common name refers to the fact that all Mactra shells have a large ligamental pit at the hinge line, which in life contains a large internal ligament. Most bivalves in other families have an external ligament instead.

Species
 Mactra chinensis Philippi, 1846
 Mactra glabrata Linnaeus, 1767 
 Mactra glauca Born, 1778 
 Mactra grandis (Gmelin, 1791)
 Mactra guidoi Signorelli & F. Scarabino, 2010
 Mactra isabelleana d'Orbiginny, 1846
 Mactra lilacea Lamarck, 1818
 Mactra quadrangularis Reeve, 1854
 Mactra sauliana Gray, 1838 
 Mactra stultorum (Linnaeus, 1758) 
 Mactra veneriformis (シオフキガイ, shiofukigai in Japanese; 동죽 조개 in Korean)

Species brought into synonymy
 Mactra acutissima Cosel, 1995: synonym of Scissodesma acutissima (Cosel, 1995)
 Mactra angolensis Cosel, 1995: synonym of Scissodesma angolensis (Cosel, 1995)
 Mactra discors Gray, 1873: synonym of Spisula discors (Gray, 1837)
 Mactra inconstans Cosel, 1995: synonym of Huberimactra inconstans (Cosel, 1995)
 Mactra micronitida Cosel, 1995: synonym of Scissodesma micronitida (Cosel, 1995)
 Mactra murchisoni Deshayes, 1854 : synonym of Spisula murchisoni (Reeve, 1854)
 Mactra nitida Spengler, 1786: synonym of Scissodesma nitida (Gmelin, 1791)
 Mactra ordinaria (E.A.Smith, 1898) : synonym of Maorimactra ordinaria (E. A. Smith, 1898)
 Mactra ovata Wood 1828 : synonym of Paphies australis (Gmelin, 1791)
 Mactra rostrata Spengler, 1802: synonym of Barymactra rostrata (Spengler, 1802)
 Mactra silicula Reeve, 1854: synonym of Mactrotoma compressa (Spengler, 1802)
 Mactra tristis (Reeve, 1854): synonym of Cyclomactra tristis (Reeve, 1854)
 Mactra vitrea Gray, 1837: synonym of Huberimactra grayi (M. Huber, 2015)

References

 

Mactridae
Bivalve genera